St. Joseph's Sr. Sec. School is a convent senior secondary school, affiliated to the CBSE, New Delhi located in Jajmau, Kanpur, Uttar Pradesh, India.

Location & Demographics
The school is situated on Joseph Street, Defence Colony, Jajmau in the suburb of Kanpur. According to school census 2010 there were 2500 children in the school including Kindergarten students.

Alumnus
Kritika Kamra, a popular TV serial actress

References

External links
 Blog

Christian schools in Uttar Pradesh
Private schools in Uttar Pradesh
Primary schools in Uttar Pradesh
High schools and secondary schools in Uttar Pradesh
Schools in Kanpur
Educational institutions established in 1965
1965 establishments in Uttar Pradesh